Santora is a surname. Notable people with the surname include:

 Jack Santora (born 1976), American baseball infielder
 Jamie Santora (born 1971), American politician
 Nicholas Santora (1942–2018), American mobster
 Nick Santora (born 1970), American writer and producer
 Pete Santora (born 1976), American soccer player
 Saverio Santora (1935–1987), American mobster

See also
 Santora Building, historic commercial building in Santa Ana, California

Italian-language surnames